Hoseynabad-e Jadid (also Romanized as Ḩoseynābād-e Jadīd; also known as Ḩoseynābād, Ḩoseynābād-e Bādīz, and Ḩoseynābād-e Deh Now) is a village in Jorjafak Rural District, in the Central District of Zarand County, Kerman Province, Iran. At the 2006 census, its population was 38, in 10 families.

References 

Populated places in Zarand County